Monica Malta is a Brazilian researcher who works mostly to address health inequalities faced by LGBTQ persons. She is currently a professor at the University of Toronto and a scientist at the Centre for Addiction and Mental Health. She was elected a TED fellow in 2022.

Early life and education 
Malta was born in Brazil. As a young woman she was part of an abusive relationship, but was able to complete her studies at night. Her undergraduate studies at the Rio de Janeiro State University focused on social psychology, when she worked to improve the available treatments for people who use drugs living in slums/favelas from Rio de Janeiro. She completed both her Masters of Public Health and doctoral research at the National School of Public Health Sérgio Arouca. During her graduate studies she worked and studied to improve the lives of people living with HIV/AIDS, and Brazilian women living in deep poverty and experiencing violence.

She was awarded a National Institutes of Health award and moved to the United States, continuing her studies at the Johns Hopkins Bloomberg School of Public Health. Malta received several international awards from National Institute on Drug Abuse, the World Health Organization, among others 
At the time she had two young daughters, studying during the day and working as a dishwasher at nigh to support them. Malta started a postdoctoral research in epidemiology at the Johns Hopkins University, focusing her studies in human rights violations.

Research and career 
Malta studies the societal structures that impact the adoption of public health behavior. She has particularly looked at the mental health and HIV diagnoses of people from marginalized groups. She has focused on developing resources for LGBTQ+ people. Amongst the resources she has created, she launched an app that provided information on safe spaces in Brazil for LGBTQ+ people.

During the COVID-19 pandemic, Malta switched her research focus to the emerging coronavirus. She was diagnosed with the virus in May 2020, and went on to suffer from Long COVID. Her research focused on how South America responded to the pandemic. The region suffers from slow vaccination rates, social inequality and underfunded health systems. She was awarded the Canadian Partnership for Women and Children's Health (CanWaCH) Award for Canadian Excellence in Global Health and Gender Equality in 2020, and was a 2021 Women of Inspiration Finalist. She went on to investigate the mental health experiences of healthcare providers who were treating patients with COVID-19.

Malta was elected a TED fellow in 2022. Her fellowship advocated for human rights and the development of resources to mitigate the impacts of gender-based violence. She is currently serving on the leadership team of 500 Women Scientists.

Selected publications

References 

Living people
Federal University of Rio de Janeiro alumni
Academic staff of the University of Toronto
Mental health researchers
TED Fellows
Brazilian emigrants to Canada
1970 births